The Thrill Chaser is a 1923 American silent Western film directed by Edward Sedgwick and featuring Hoot Gibson.

Plot
As described in a film magazine, Omar K. Jenkins' (Gibson) only inheritance from an eccentric father is a copy of the Rubaiyat of Omar Khayyam. Only one of the verses conveys any meaning to him: “A book of verses underneath a bough, a loaf of bread, a jug of wine and thou.” He is reading it under a tree when he finds himself face to face with the “thou" of his dreams. They strike up an immediate friendship over the book of poems, when suddenly the whistle from the locomotive warns them her train is about to start. He aids her in making the train, riding alongside the moving cars and passing her from his horse to the platform. He has forgotten to get her name. 

Omar goes to Los Angeles and begins to haunt the film studios. At Universal City he finally gets within the gates as an extra man. Here he meets all the celebrated stars and directors on the lot in a series of highly diverting comedy situations and scenes. The new remake of The Last Days of Pompeii is being filmed, with Hobart Henley directing Reginald Denny and Laura La Plante. Omar's job is carrying a mean spear in this one at three bucks a day. It was when his spear and the rope which was to bring about the destruction of the Roman palace on the film set got mixed up that Omar’s career began. He tugged on his spear, and the rope gets pulled early and the palace at Pompeii crashes. Omar gets one more chance at the studio. Omar is engaged to double for a young star who is playing an Arabian role. Among the visitors at the studio on this day are three mysterious foreigners, who watch proceedings from the side lines. They are Sheik Ussan (Neill), head of a desert tribe in Arabia, and his daughter Olala (Dove), and Prince Ahmend (Lawrence). Omar is engaged to return to Arabia with the old sheik and his daughter and “double for” Prince Ahmend until such a time as Prince Ahmend feels like coming over himself. This arrangement leads to many amusing and thrilling climaxes in the struggle between Omar as the fake Prince Ahmend and the villainous Abdul Bey (Whitlock) for possession of both the throne and the girl. When Abdul Bey is at last defeated and Omar and the girl are thinking of picking out a nice flat on Euphrates Avenue, Prince Ahmend returns and gums up everything. But a clever ruse on the girl’s part leads to a happy and highly romantic solution.

Cast

Preservation
With no prints of The Thrill Chaser located in any film archives, it is a lost film.

See also
 Hoot Gibson filmography

References

External links

 
 

1923 films
1923 lost films
1923 Western (genre) films
American black-and-white films
Films directed by Edward Sedgwick
Lost American films
Lost Western (genre) films
Silent American Western (genre) films
Universal Pictures films
1920s American films
Films set in Los Angeles
Films with screenplays by Richard Schayer